The xaxado is a popular dance created in the Sertão of Pernambuco state, Brazil.  It was often practiced by cangaceiros of the region to commemorate victory in battle; it is also practiced as a traditional dance by the local population as a whole.

The name xaxado comes from the noise made by the cangaceiros' sandals as they strike the sand during the dance.

See also
Cangaço

External links
History of the dance
History of the dance

Brazilian music
Brazilian dances